Martin Luserke (3 May 1880 in Schöneberg near Berlin, Prussia, German Reich – 1 June 1968 in Meldorf, Holstein, Germany) was a progressive pedagogue, a bard, writer and theatre maker. He was one of the leading figures of German progressive education and a precursor of outdoor education. As his distinguished achievement counts the integration of community theatre into school and youth work. It was also integrated in German Youth Movement.

Family and Youth 
He was one of three sons of the construction expert Carl Friedrich Wilhelm Luserke (1851–1931) and his wife Amalie Elisabeth Luserke (1855–1942), née Lindhorst. She originated from Westphalia, whereas the Luserke family originated from Breslau, Silesia. Both were Pietists. His siblings were his older brother, Johannes Fridrich Wilhelm (* 6. April 1877 in Berlin; † 4. April 1949 in Dresden), and his younger brother, Otto Karl Gottfried Luserke (* 19. November 1887 in Berlin). From his father's side the men had been carpenters for generations. His father worked his way up from a builder to a construction supervisor and became an architect who worked as an examination administrator at public works service of Berlin.

During his childhood, Martin Luserke got the chance to become acquainted with the port of Hamburg, the river Elbe and the German coast along the North Sea and the Baltic Sea. Via sailboat and steamboat he got to know the East Frisian island Spiekeroog and Heligoland in the German Bight. According to his mother's memoirs he very early felt attracted to the Sea. His parents refused to let him go to the Sea.

Starting at the age of ten, he read works by Friedrich Schiller, at the age of thirteen those written by William Shakespeare, Goethe und Ibsen, all comprehensively and passionately. Reportedly he had his first contact with a stage at Schauspielhaus Berlin where he watched the drama William Tell by Schiller. The play fell short of his high expectations so he was badly disappointed. Later this experience might have been an influence on his own conceptions of theatre works.

In the age of fifteen, he broke with his family. The catalyst was a moment when his mother burnt his Shakespeare books which he had read secretly.

In 1908, he married Marie Anna "Annemarie" Elisabeth Gerwien (1878–1926). He met her through his work for Wickersdorf Free School Community, where she worked as a matron. She was the daughter of Prussian Oberstleutnant (= Lieutenant Colonel) Paul Vincenz Gerwien (* 7 December, 1843 in Neisse; † 12 September, 1923 in Dresden). The couple got four children, one girl and three boys: Ursula (* 20 January, 1910 in Wickersdorf; † 1987), Klaus (* 6 October, 1912 in Wickersdorf), Heiner (* 4 August, 1914 in Wickersdorf) und Dieter (* 15 September, 1918; † 17. February 2005). Between 1938 and 1968 Auguste Schwarting became Luserke's housekeeper.

Education 
He became a pupil of the Herrnhuter Brüdergemeine in Berlin. When he was fifteen, his parents sent him to Herrnhuter Lehrerseminar in Niesky, Lusatia, to become a teacher. Between 1900 and 1904 he worked as an elementary teacher at Pädagogium Niesky. There he got estranged from Pietism which he found cold-hearted. He moved to Thuringia and studied Mathematics and Philosophy at Friedrich Schiller University Jena.

In 1905 he made a field excursion to Brittany, where he hiked for several months through the remains of Celtic culture of Stone Age. Via the lecture of a bard on the island of Molène he got inspired to use oral and written tradition like myths, sagas and legends for his own work. He also travelled to Italy and Egypt.

He got influenced by his academic teachers, the Nobel Prize winner Rudolf Christoph Eucken, Ernst Haeckel, Wilhelm Rein and later by Hermann Lietz. Luserke's ideas about an idealized lifelike education to develop an attitude can be traced back to them. Disappointed from academic teaching programme and classical pedagogy he dropped out of university in 1906.

In 1931 Luserke completed a mate's certificate in Leer, East Frisia.

Career

1906: D.L.E.H. Haubinda 
At Easter 1906 he joined Hermann Lietz and started to work as a teacher at Deutsches Landerziehungsheim (D.L.E.H.) in Haubinda, Thuringia. Three years before there had been a controversy about the admittance of Jewish pupils. According to Walter Benjamin (1892–1940) only Luserke and Gustav Wyneken (1875–1964) formed an opposition against the daily military drill at this school. Its resulting conflict with the administration ended with a secession of both teachers.

1906–1925: Freie Schulgemeinde Wickersdorf 

Together with so-called pedagogic rebels like Gustav Wyneken, Paul Geheeb (1870–1961) and August Halm (1869–1929) in autumn 1906 Luserke founded the Freie Schulgemeinde in the small town Wickersdorf near Saalfeld in Thuringian Forest. Whereas Wyneken is described more as a theoretician the practitioner Luserke is considered to be the one who added substantial stimulus. His conception of a didactics which offered immediate hands-on-experience influenced several other pedagogues like Hans Alfken (1899–1994). In Wickersdorf Luserke worked with Hans-Windekilde Jannasch (1883–1981), Peter Suhrkamp (1891–1959) and Bernhard Uffrecht (1885–1959). Right from the school's foundation he started to perform community theatre. His stage work was based on William Shakespeare. His first play Blut und Liebe (= Blood and Love) which is performed in many schools until today, is a Grotesque based on Hamlet.

Between 1910 and 1914 and again between 1922 and 1925, he served as the school's principal. From 1914 to 1918 he served as a soldier in World War I. In 1917 he got severely wounded in France and became a POW. His head injury marked him for life so he always wore a cap. Influenced by German Revolution of 1918–19 he was one of the authors (along with George Bernard Shaw) of a book series by Marxist Karl Korsch (1886–1961). In his book Luserke opted for a socialist ethics of work which should follow common interests.

In school pedagogical conflicts with Gustav Wyneken were persistent. Wyneken was part of several paedophile scandals and later got sentenced. Some other teachers also were paedophiles. Luserke, Rudolf Aeschlimann (1884–1961) and Dr. Paul Reiner (1886–1932) first formed a so-called triumvirate in opposition to Wyneken and his followers. It resulted not only in a polarization but in a development of factions which divided teachers, employees and pupils. Luserke decided to found a new school "at the border of the habitable world". Aeschlimann, Fritz Hafner (1877–1964), Luserke and Reiner together with their families including eleven children plus employees and sixteen of their pupils moved to the North Sea and settled on Juist Island in East Frisia.

1925–1934: Schule am Meer 

On 1 May 1925, Luserke founded Schule am Meer (= School by the Sea), where he established the first and only theatre building of a German school. The unique project primarily spanned a group of five school buildings which were planned in 1929 by Berlin-based architect Bruno Ahrends. The theatre was erected between 1930 and 1931. It was used for community theatre, the school's choir and the school's orchestra, conducted by composer and pianist Eduard Zuckmayer (1890–1972), the older brother of famous writer Carl Zuckmayer who visited and worked at Schule am Meer. With their pupils Luserke and Zuckmayer went on tour through major German cities like Berlin, Cologne or Stuttgart to perform on stages where they got very positive critics in the newspapers. Heinrich Meyer started his career at Schule am Meer, Hans Hess, Walter Georg Kühne, Felicitas Kukuck, and Beate Uhse belonged to its pupils. The school created a botanical garden right in the dunes of the sandbank and developed eleven vegetable gardens for self-supply. In the school's workshops detailed ship models were built as well as seakeeping sailboats (dinghy cruisers) but also parts to built up wooden shacks. Its sports programme included gymnastics and cold baths in the sea, athletics, boxing, fistball, association football, handball, field hockey, ice skate, prisonball and sailing. When Luserke's renowned school was closed in spring 1934 due to Nazi Gleichschaltung (= Nazification) and Antisemitism he decided to work as a free writer.

Krake ZK 14 

In the Netherlands he bought the old Dutch fishery vessel ZK 14, which he named Krake (= octopus). Henceforward he deployed it as his floating poet's workshop to sail the shallow waters of the coastal regions of The Netherlands, Germany, Denmark, Southern Norway and Southern Sweden. In the harbours he opened his ship for tale-telling and readings. Mostly young people visited his ship, some attended during trip sections. One of the later well-known listeners and passengers was Beate Uhse, one of his former pupils. In 1935 he got awarded with Literaturpreis der Reichshauptstadt Berlin (= literature award of Reich's capital Berlin) for his historic novel Hasko which was published in German, Dutch and French. He also wrote his most favourite book Obadjah und die ZK 14 and a Viking trilogy.

Meldorf, Holstein 
At the end of 1938, he went off board to settle in Meldorf, Holstein. There he continued his work as a free writer. His most successful books were published during the 1930s and 1940s. Several of his books were also printed for army postal service of German Wehrmacht (army and navy) during World War II.

Luserke cannot be described as toeing the Nazi party line. Instead, his ideal and book topics were in some extent similar to Völkisch movement. His literary work was mostly fiction with a revival of Norse mythology, Breton legends and Continental Germanic mythology so it contains no Nazi propaganda. Nevertheless, it matched some popular Völkisch and Nazi topics which was convenient during dictatorship to get accepted as a professional writer.

Between 1947 and 1952, he got a teaching assignment at Meldorfer Gelehrtenschule (founded in 1540) where he introduced his community theatre again. There he named his fully developed play as Meldorfer Spielweise which he characterized as a special style of community theatre. From the start all participants are involved in the play's development. Actors, musicians, handcrafter and technicians are part of a team which composes, writes poetry and thinks about elements like dance, singing, period costumes, signs and symbolism, technical effects. Along the way Luserke's most appreciated activities helped to save the school's survival which was endangered after WWII.

Luserke also held advanced training courses for youth group leaders at Jugendgruppenleiterschule in Bad Harzburg-Bündheim. In 1955 he completed his late work about his Shakespeare studies Pan-Apollon-Prospero which got published in 1957. He died in the age of 88 and got buried in Hage, East Frisia, next to his wife Annemarie.

In 2018 his descendants abandoned his grave. However, his gravestone was brought to the East Frisian island of Juist in the North Sea and placed there in the cemetery on the island in 2019.

Awards and distinctions 

 1935 – 1st Prize of Literaturpreis der Reichshauptstadt Berlin (= Literature Award of Reich capital Berlin) for the novel Hasko (published in German, Dutch and French)
 1950 – Honorary Member of Schleswig-Holstein writer's assembly
 1954 – Order of Merit of the Federal Republic of Germany for his community theatre work
 1958 – Friedrich Hebbel Award
 1960 – Golden Medal awarded by University of Kiel
 1986 – As a permanent loan the state library of Kiel gave Luserke's furnishings to Heimatverein Juist. Since then it is exhibited in Sibje House on Juist Island.
 1987 – On 4 May a commemorative plaque was attached to his home at 37, Jungfernstieg in Meldorf
 2010 – Next to his home at 37, Jungfernstieg in Meldorf a new commemorative plaque was installed

Literature 
 Martin Kiessig: Martin Luserke. Gestalt und Werk. Versuch einer Wesensdeutung. Dissertation Universität Leipzig 1936. 
 
 M. von Kellenbach: Der Mensch in der Dichtung des Dritten Reiches (Hasko). Phil. Diss. 1939.
 Hans-Windekilde Jannasch: Martin Luserke zum 70. Geburtstag. Sammlung, 1 January 1950, Vol. 5, p. 377.
 "Martin Luserke 75 Jahre alt". In: Bildung und Erziehung, 1955, Ausg. 8, Böhlau Verlag 1955, p. 299.
 Walter Jantzen: "50 Jahre Laienspiel – Gottfried Haaß-Berkow, Martin Luserke, Rudolf Mirbt". In: Bildung und Erziehung 1956, Vol. 9, Böhlau-Verlag, Wien, Weimar 1956, pp. 245–256.
 Jean Nordhaus: The Laienspiel Movement and Brecht's Lehrstuecke. Phil. Diss. 1969.
 Franz L. Pelgen: Das Laienspiel und die Spielweise Martin Luserkes. Dissertation Universität München, Philosophische Fakultät, München 1957.
 Herbert Giffei: "Luserke, Martin". In: Schleswig-holsteinisches biographisches Lexikon, 1971, pp. 193–195.
 Anneliese Knoop: "Martin Luserke" In: Lexikon der Kinder- und Jugendliteratur, Vol. 2 I–O, Klaus Doderer (Hrsg.), Beltz, Weinheim/Pullach/Basel 1977.
 Herbert Giffei: Martin Luserke und das Theater. Landesarbeitsgemeinschaft für Spiel und Amateurtheater in Nordrhein-Westfalen (Hrsg.), Vol. 18, Hilfen für Spielleiter. Doepgen, Bergheim 1979.
 Kurt Sydow: "Die Lebensfahrt eines großen Erzählers – Martin Luserke (1880–1968)". In: Jahrbuch des Archivs der deutschen Jugendbewegung 12, 1980.
 Herbert Giffei: Martin Luserke – Ein Wegbereiter der modernen Erlebnispädagogik. In: Wegbereiter der modernen Erlebnispädagogik, Vol. 6. Klaus Neubauer Verlag, Lüneburg 1987.
 Cornelia Susanne Anna Godde: Das Laienspiel als reformpädagogisches Element. Die Bedeutung Martin Luserkes für das heutige Bildungswesen (= Beiträge zu Erziehungswissenschaften, Vol. 3). Dissertation Universität Bonn. Wehle, Witterschlick / Bonn 1990, .
 Jörg W. Ziegenspeck (Ed.): Martin Luserke. Reformpädagoge – Dichter – Theatermann; Gründer und Leiter der "Schule am Meer" auf der Nordseeinsel Juist (1925–1934) (= Wegbereiter der modernen Erlebnispädagogik, Band 6). Neubauer, Lüneburg 1990, .
 Brigitte Cléac'h: Martin Luserke und die Bretagne: Anfang einer Reise zur Sage auf der Insel Molène im Jahre 1905, Dissertation Université de Bretagne Occidentale, Mémoire de Maîtrise, Brest 1991. 
 Nicole Becker: Reformpädagogik in der Weser-Ems-Region: das Beispiel „Haus am Meer“ von Martin Luserke Dissertation Universität Oldenburg 1993. 
 Ulrich Schwerdt: Martin Luserke (1880–1968). Reformpädagogik im Spannungsfeld von pädagogischer Innovation und kulturkritischer Ideologie. Eine biographische Rekonstruktion (= Studien zur Bildungsreform, Vol. 23). Dissertation Universität Paderborn 1992. Lang, Frankfurt am Main u.a. 1993. .
 Otto Seydel: "Das Echo: Die Geschichte der Vision einer 'Neuen Schule'". In: Bildung und Erziehung, 1994, Vol. 47(2). ISSN 0006-2456, pp. 175–186.
 Jürgen Oelkers: Eros und Lichtgestalten: Die Gurus der Landerziehungsheime (PDF file; 242 KB)
 Gunther Nickel / Johanna Schrön (Ed.), Carl Zuckmayer: Geheimreport. Wallstein-Verlag, Göttingen 2002. .
 Albrecht Sauer: Martin Luserke. Reihe: The Oxford Encyclopedia of Maritime History. Oxford University Press, 2007. .
 "Luserke, Martin". In: Horn, Klaus-Peter / Kemnitz, Heidemarie / Marotzki, Winfried / Sandfuchs, Uwe (Ed.): Klinkhardt Lexikon Erziehungswissenschaft (KLE). Bad Heilbrunn 2012.

External links 

 Private website of the Luserke family in Cologne, Germany (in German language)

References 

People of the German Empire
People of the Weimar Republic
German essayists
German male novelists
German male short story writers
German short story writers
Writers from Berlin
20th-century German non-fiction writers
20th-century German short story writers
German Army personnel of World War I
Recipients of the Cross of the Order of Merit of the Federal Republic of Germany
German male dramatists and playwrights
20th-century German dramatists and playwrights
20th-century German male writers
German male non-fiction writers
20th-century essayists
Founders of educational institutions
German schoolteachers
German Youth Movement
Outdoor educators
1880 births
1968 deaths